Translocon-associated protein subunit delta is a protein that in humans is encoded by the SSR4 gene.

SSR4, also called TRAPD, is assumed to be involved in protein secretion. It is located in the Xq28 region, arranged in a compact head-to-head manner with the IDH3G gene. These two genes are driven by a bidirectional promoter located between them and encode proteins involved in unrelated biochemical pathways located in different compartments of the cell. The nontranscribed intergenic region represents only 133 bp and is embedded in a CpG island. The CpG island functions as a bidirectional promoter to initiate the transcription of both functionally unrelated genes with distinct expression patterns. SSR4 consists of six exons and is approximately 70 kb telomeric length from the ALD gene. Although alternative splicing of exon 5 has not been detected in the human SSR4 gene, transcript variants missing the region homologous to the human exon 5 have been detected in both Xenopus laevis and Mus musculus.

References

Further reading